The Republic of Korea Navy Somali Sea Escort Task Group (Korean: 대한민국 해군 소말리아 해역 호송전대), also known as "Cheonghae" Unit (Korean: 청해부대, Hanja: 淸海部隊) was established by the Republic of Korea Navy to protect civilian ships near the coast of Somalia under Combined Task Force 151. The naval task force is named after the historical 9th-century Korean military base Cheonghaejin.

Deployed from Jinhae Naval Base, the modern-day unit is responsible for safely escorting hundreds of commercial vessels and several rescues involving ships from The Bahamas, Denmark, North Korea and South Korea. In January 2011, commandos in the Cheonghae Unit successfully executed a highly publicized rescue of a South Korean tanker, freeing crew members held hostage by Somali pirates.

Operational history

2009

 was the first ship to be deployed as part of the unit to Somali waters on March 13, 2009. On April 17, it deterred pirates from boarding the cargo vessel Puma, which was registered in Denmark. On May 4, the Munmu the Great responded to a distress call by the North Korean merchant vessel Dabaksol. A Westland Lynx military helicopter was launched to protect the Dabaksol until the pirates had fled. The North Korean sailors thanked the members of the unit before proceeding to India. A member of the Joint Chiefs of Staff of the Republic of Korea stated, "This is the first time that the South Korean navy has rescued a North Korean cargo ship from a pirate’s attack. According to the international law of the sea, we should help all vessel[s] regardless of their nationality."

ROKS Dae Joyeong was dispatched in July 2009 to relieve the Munmu the Great, and rescued four civilian vessels. In August, the Dae Joyeong raided a pirate vessel that had been pursuing the Bahamian container ship Notos Scan. In September, it freed the Cypriot commercial vessel Alexandria, along with five Yemeni crew members who were being held by pirates.

ROKS Yi Sun-shin was deployed in November 2009 to become the third ship of the unit. It defeated pirates twice while escorting 460 vessels during its tour of duty.

2010

On April 4, 2010, Somali pirates took over the South Korean supertanker Samho Dream along with its 24 crew members, including five Koreans and nineteen Filipinos. When the Yi Sun-shin pursued the hijacked vessel, the pirates threatened to kill the tanker crew.

ROKS Kang Gamchan relieved the Yi Sun-shin in May 2010, and transported injured crew members from a Bahamian drilling ship to a hospital later that month. In August, the Kang Gamchan also provided medical assistance to the crew of a ship registered in Hong Kong.

ROKS Wang Geon was deployed later that year to become the fifth ship of the unit. Among the 432 vessels it escorted was the Samho Dream, which had finally been released by pirates in November for a record ransom payment of $9.5 million.

2011 rescue operation

On January 21, 2011, the Cheonghae Unit rescued the crew of the Samho Jewelry, a chemical tanker held hostage by Somali pirates; 8 pirates were killed, and 5 were captured. The captain of the tanker was wounded during the operation, but the rest of the crew members were unhurt.

2021 covid-19 infections
On 19 July, 2021, it is reported that 247 out of 301 crew members of the 34th contingent of the Cheonghae Unit on the Munmu the Great was tested positive for the covid-19. Two Korean Air Force KC-330 departed with 200 replacement members to transport the 301 entire crew members back to South Korea. After returning to South Korea, it is revealed that 270 crew members are tested positive.

Unit rotation

See also

Combined Task Force 151
List of ships attacked by Somali pirates in 2011
Piracy in Somalia

References

Further reading

External links

Cheonghae Unit at KBS World
Cheonghae Unit Dispatched to Chase Somali Pirates at Arirang News

Military units and formations established in 2009
Overseas deployments of South Korea armed forces
Counterterrorist organizations
Military units and formations of South Korea
Republic of Korea Navy
Piracy in Somalia
Anti-piracy
Somalia–South Korea relations